The Walrus and Kritskoi Islands are a group of small islands in the Bering Sea, close to the coast of Alaska. The group is part of a cluster of other small coastal islands called the Kudobin Islands.

The Walrus and Kritskoi Islands are located close to Nelson Lagoon,  to the West of Port Moller, on the Alaska Peninsula (southern) side of Bristol Bay, Low.

Walrus Island 
The largest island is Walrus, being about 23.5 km long and 3 km wide. The islands are flat, the highest point on Walrus Island being only 1 m.

Etymology 
These coastal islands were renamed in 1882 by W. H. Dall, USC&GS.  Russian Captain Litke (1836) had named Walrus Island as "Volchie," meaning "wolf," in 1836. This name is now applied to the eastern tip of this feature.

Kritskoi Island 

One of Kudobin Islands,  West of village of Port Moller, Alaska, Bristol Bay Low.

Kritskoi Island is only 3.3 km long, but with a height of 4 m it is noticeably higher than Walrus.

Etymology 
Kritskoi Island was named "Kritskoi ile" by Capt. Lutke (1836, p. 261), IRN. He erroneously called it "L'ile aux Loups," or "wolf island," on his Chart 14.

See also 
List of islands of Alaska

References

General references 

 USGS-GNIS
 Captain (Count) Feodor Petrovich Lutke

Islands of the Aleutian Islands
Islands of Aleutians East Borough, Alaska
Islands of Alaska